Sons of Steel is a 1934 American film directed by Charles Lamont.

Cast 
Charles Starrett as Phillip Mason Chadburne
Polly Ann Young as Rose Mason
William Bakewell as Roland Chadburne
Walter Walker as John Chadburne
Holmes Herbert as Curtis Chadburne
Richard Carlyle as Tom Mason
Florence Roberts as Sarah Mason
Aileen Pringle as Enid Chadburne
Adolph Milar as Stanislaus
Edgar Norton as Higgins
Barbara Bedford as Miss Peters
Tom Ricketts as Williams
Frank LaRue as Mike - the Foreman
Al Thompson as Carson
Harry Semels as Ryan
Lloyd Ingraham as Draftsman
Edward LeSaint as Mr. Herman

External links

1934 films
1934 drama films
Films directed by Charles Lamont
American black-and-white films
American drama films
Chesterfield Pictures films
1930s English-language films
1930s American films